Mochala is a rural locality (a village) in Mezzhenskoye Rural Settlement, Ustyuzhensky District, Vologda Oblast, Russia. The population was 55 as of 2002.

Geography 
Marfino is the nearest rural locality.

References 

Rural localities in Ustyuzhensky District